Jørgen Henriksen (born 16 July 1942) is a Danish former footballer who played as a goalkeeper. He made five appearances for the Denmark national team from 1967 to 1972.

References

External links
 
 Profile at NASL Jerseys
 

1942 births
Living people
Sportspeople from Frederiksberg
Danish men's footballers
Association football goalkeepers
Denmark international footballers
Eredivisie players
North American Soccer League (1968–1984) players
Hvidovre IF players
Boston Beacons players
FC Utrecht players
Danish expatriate men's footballers
Danish expatriate sportspeople in the United States
Expatriate soccer players in the United States
Danish expatriate sportspeople in the Netherlands
Expatriate footballers in the Netherlands